Trygve Brodahl (20 August 1905 in Hønefoss – 11 April 1996) was a Norwegian cross-country skier who competed during the 1930s.

He won a silver medal at the 1930 FIS Nordic World Ski Championships in 17 km and a silver in the 4 × 10 km relay as well as a bronze at 50 km in 1935. In 1939, Brodahl won the 18 km cross-country skiing event at the Holmenkollen ski festival. Because of his successes, Brodahl was awarded the Holmenkollen medal in 1939 (shared with Sven Selånger and Lars Bergendahl).

He also competed in the men's 50 kilometre event at the 1936 Winter Olympics.

Cross-country skiing results
All results are sourced from the International Ski Federation (FIS).

Olympic Games

World Championships
 3 medals – (2 silver, 1 bronze)

References

External links

Holmenkollen medalists - click Holmenkollmedaljen for downloadable pdf file 
Holmenkollen winners since 1892 - click Vinnere for downloadable pdf file 

1905 births
1996 deaths
Holmenkollen medalists
Holmenkollen Ski Festival winners
Norwegian male cross-country skiers
FIS Nordic World Ski Championships medalists in cross-country skiing
Olympic cross-country skiers of Norway
Cross-country skiers at the 1936 Winter Olympics
People from Ringerike (municipality)
Sportspeople from Viken (county)